Linda or Lynda George may refer to:

 Linda George (Australian singer), Australian pop singer popular in the 1970s
 Linda George (Assyrian singer), Assyrian-American pop singer popular in the 1980s–2010s
 Lynda Day George, American television actress popular in the 1960s and 1970s
 Linda K. George (born 1947), American sociologist and gerontologist